Frederick II (19 August 185621 April 1918) was the Duke of Anhalt from 1904 until 1918.

Early life
He was born in Dessau in 1856, he was the second son of Hereditary Prince Frederick of Anhalt-Dessau and his wife Princess Antoinette of Saxe-Altenburg.

His father succeeded as Duke of Anhalt on 22 May 1871 and Frederick became heir apparent and Hereditary Prince following the death of his elder brother Leopold on 2 February 1886.

Marriage
Frederick was married on 2 July 1889 at Karlsruhe to Princess Marie of Baden (26 July 186529 November 1939). She was a daughter of Prince Wilhelm of Baden and his wife Princess Maria of Leuchtenberg, as well as an elder sister of Prince Maximilian of Baden, 8th Chancellor of Germany. The marriage produced no issue.

Reign
On 24 January 1904, Frederick succeeded his father as Duke of Anhalt.

During his reign he was known for his love of music and maintained a Court Theatre which became celebrated throughout Europe.

He was Grand Master of the Order of Albert the Bear and a Knight of the Order of the Black Eagle. In 1914, during World War I, he instituted the Friedrich Cross as a decoration for merit in time of war.

He died at Ballenstedt Castle on 22 April 1918. As his marriage to Marie of Baden was without issue, he was succeeded as Duke by his younger brother Eduard.

Honours and arms

 German orders and decorations

 Foreign orders and decorations

Ancestry

References

1856 births
1918 deaths
House of Ascania
Princes of Anhalt
Dukes of Anhalt
Corps students
German people of French descent
Grand Crosses of the Order of Saint Stephen of Hungary
Grand Crosses of the Order of the Star of Romania
Recipients of the Order of the Cross of Takovo
Royal reburials